North/South Convergence is the debut studio album for both American keyboardist/composer-arranger Lee Tomboulian and his Latin jazz ensemble Circo, recorded in September 2000 and released on December 3, 2001 by Circo Records.

Reception
All About Jazz critic Dave Hughes gave the album high marks on both conception and execution:
The CD is characterized by consistently interesting percussion, adventurous harmonies, and unpredictable, quirky melodies. The band moves effortlessly across time signatures, shifting from 4 to either 6 or 3. [...] Lee Tomboulian on piano and Pete Brewer on sax and flute contribute well-constructed solos in every rhythmic terrain. Both Tomboulian and bassist Brian Warthen understand that their instruments fulfill rhythmic as well as harmonic roles. [...] This CD truly charts its own course throughout the program. It’s unique and creative, and certainly recommended.

Track listing
All selections composed by Lee Tomboulian except where noted.
 "Samberg" - 4:46
 "Ariel" (words from The Tempest by William Shakespeare) - 6:00
 "Grace" (Betty Tomboulian) - 6:12
 "Rhoda Ribbon" - 4:08
 "Circo TV Theme'" - 4:36
 "Metropolis" (Brian Warthen) - 5:49
 "Ana" - 4:05 
 "Hinde Who?" - 5:30
 "Vauda's Song" - 5:07
 "Six-Fortitude" - 5:03
 "Memory Gardens" - 6:29
 "Old 100th" (traditional; arr. Hugo Fattoruso and Lee Tomboulian) - 3:11
 "O Vendedor de Sonhos" (Fernando Brant - Milton Nascimento) - 2:14

Personnel
Lee Tomboulian - leader, piano and synths
Pete Brewer - saxes and flute
Brian Warthen - bass
Dennis Durick - conga, bongo, campana
Ricardo Bozas - percussion
Betty Tomboulian - vocals

References

2001 debut albums
Latin jazz albums by American artists